Unibroue is a brewery in Chambly, Quebec, Canada, that was started by Serge Racine and Quebec native André Dion. The company was purchased by Sleeman Breweries Ltd. in 2004, which was itself taken over by Sapporo in 2006. The company was incorporated in 1993 and is the first of three microbrewing companies in Greater Montreal area (followed by "Brasseurs RJ" and "McAuslan"), both chronologically and in terms of sale benefits.

History 

Unibroue was founded by business partners André Dion and Serge Racine who had acquired 75% of La Brasserie Massawippi Inc. of Lennoxville in 1990.  The two purchased the remainder of the shares at the end of 1991 when they transferred their interest in La Brasserie Massawippi Inc. to Unibroue.

By 1992, La Brasserie Massawippi Inc. became a wholly owned subsidiary of Unibroue.  Afterward, it changed its corporate name to Brasserie Broubec Inc. and in July 1993 merged with Unibroue.  It was bought by Canadian brewer, Sleeman Breweries Ltd., in 2004.  Sleeman, in turn, was purchased in 2006 by Sapporo.

Beers 
Unibroue makes a wide range of beers; although, there is a focus on Belgian-style brews, such as their Maudite ('Damned'), La Fin du Monde ('The End of the World'), and Don de Dieu ('Gift from God'). Most of Unibroue's beers are bottled "on the lees", or containing yeast sediment (or lees). This practice provides additional fermentation, also called bottle-conditioned, after bottling. The result is a beer which ages well if kept in the dark and unrefrigerated, and allows it to be shipped relatively cheaply to international markets. The yeast gives Unibroue beers a cloudy appearance and provides a characteristic element to the taste.  On many of their labels, suggested serving temperatures (for example, "better at 12°–14°C") are included.

Standard line

La Fin du Monde 
La Fin du Monde ( French for "The End of the World") is a Belgian-style tripel and bottle conditioned golden ale introduced in July 1994. The name is claimed to derive from the European explorers' belief that they had reached the end of the world when they arrived in the Americas.

The colour is a cloudy blonde with a golden hue. Though similar to Belgian tripels in appearance, La Fin du Monde is less bitter and more spicy (featuring coriander and orange peel), more similar to Tripel Karmeliet than standard tripels like Chimay and Westmalle. The beer contains a very high (9% ABV) alcohol content. As of 2016, this beer has earned more medals and awards, including some of the world's highest honors, than any other Canadian beer.

Don de Dieu 
Don de Dieu is a wheat ale which is re-fermented in the bottle, brewed in the Belgian strong pale ale style. The beer and label were inspired by the explorer Samuel de Champlain de Brouage and his ship, the Don de Dieu ('Gift from God').

Maudite 
Translated into "Damned", this is an 8% ABV Strong amber-red ale.  (The label denotes the style as "Belgian Style Double Ale").

Blanche de Chambly 
Blanche de Chambly is a Belgian-style witbier. The first refermented white beer brewed according to Belgian tradition in North America. 5.0% ABV.

À Tout Le Monde 
Added in 2016, À Tout Le Monde is a Saison style beer. Added in 2016, at 4.5% ABV, it is the brewery's lowest alcohol beer. It was brewed at the request of guitarist Dave Mustaine of Megadeth.

Special brew-lines 
Unibroue brews and bottles the Trader Joe's Vintage Ale.

Awards 
La Fin du Monde has been the winner of many medals of excellence: 5 platinum, 6 gold, and 1 silver from the Beverage Testing Institute since its introduction in 1994. In 2004 it won the gold medal at the Los Angeles County Fair for Belgian-Style Abbey Ale.

Don de Dieu has won four gold medals from the Beverage Testing Institute since its introduction in 1998.

Grande Reserve 17 received the "World's best dark ale" award at the World Beer Awards in London, England in 2011. Also, it received a Platinum medal from the Beverage Testing Institute in 2009, 2010, and 2011.

Unibroue has won several awards in subsequent years too, at the World Beer Awards. In 2015, for example, the company's products received many accolades. La Fin du Monde was declared World's Best Belgian Style Tripel, La Résolution and Éphémère Poire (pear), La Résolution won The Americas' Best Belgian Style Strong and Éphémère Poire was named The Americas' Best Fruit Flavored Beer. The Unibroue 17 Grande Réserve was declared The Americas’ Best Vintage Dark Beer and the company won three gold medals for Terrible, Maudite, Éphémère Pomme, three silver medals for Blanche de Chambly, Trois Pistoles, Noire de Chambly, and a bronze medal for Blonde de Chambly.

At the 2016 Awards, the company won the following World's Best awards: Belgian Style Strong Dark, Unibroue Trois Pistoles and Belgian Style Tripel, Unibroue La Fin Du Monde. Conventional awards for Unibroue products included Belgian Style Strong Dark - Silver Medal,  Fruit & Vegetable Flavoured Beer - Silver Medal, Belgian Style Witbier - Gold Medal.

See also 
 Quebec beer

References

External links 
 Unibroue website

Canadian beer brands
Beer brewing companies based in Quebec
Companies based in Quebec
Chambly, Quebec
Sapporo Breweries